What Is Spiritism? (Qu'Est-ce Que le Spiritisme in French) is a brief introduction to Spiritism written by Allan Kardec in 1859, which is about a quarter of the length of The Spirits Book. Modern editions are augmented by a brief biography of the author, written by Henri Sausse, in 1896 which is mostly focused on his role in the History of Spiritism.

The book is structured as a series of conferences about Spiritism, intended to quench the public curiosity and dismiss false notions about the doctrine. It is not intended as an initiation and is not seen by Spiritists as strictly canonical but it is very important to understand Kardec's own motivations and commitment to the cause of Spiritism, as the book was entirely penned by himself, without spiritual help. Its central subjects are the following.

Criticism of Spiritism
Kardec tries to address the most common theses argued against Spiritism regarding it as a form of charlatanism. He counters the critics with the following:

 Spiritism is not a religion and is not interested on proselytizing.
 Spiritism is not for everyone, only for those who are ready to accept it.
 Spiritism will survive religion because it is not based on blind faith.
 Spiritism does not extort money from followers, everything is taught for free.
 Charges of charlatanism will not affect Spiritism because charlatans are moved by selfishness and usually want to make a stash, so they expose themselves by their own deeds. The public will eventually learn to tell the black sheep apart.

Skepticism
Kardec tries to address skeptical views of Spiritism, regarding its doctrinary uniformity and validity, its scientific character and the novelty of its concepts.

 The terms Spiritism and Spiritist are necessary to differ them from generic Spiritualism. They are not vain neologisms.
 The existing of offshoot Spiritist groups is not undesirable, but a consequence of the spreading of the doctrine. Kardec does not claim any form of leadership, except on moral grounds (as the author of the books that first established Spiritism as a coherent doctrine), and does not expect Spiritism to survive him as "Kardecism". The only problem is when some group purporting to be "Spiritist" spreads false doctrine.
 Spiritism is not superstition. It is a rational explanation of natural phenomena which science cannot assess.
 Spiritism is not witchcraft.
 Spiritism is not inherently dangerous for mental sanity, not if one is aware of the risks and acts with responsibility.

Opposition of the Church
Confronting the criticism wielded by the Catholic Church, Kardec argues that religious diversity is important and that the existence of only one religion in the Middle Ages was a fertile ground for the Inquisition and cultural backwardness.

Diversity is also important because the coexistence of different doctrines may help people who disagree with one specific doctrine to find one that suits them better. Kardec was one of the earliest proponents of a personal approach to religion. 

Although Spiritism does not claim for itself the status of a religion, it does not heed  by the dogma of any religion. 

Spiritism is not similar to Satanism

Elementary introduction to Spiritism
This chapter summarises the key points of the doctrine, notably:

 Origins and different kinds of spirits
 Communication with spirits
 Purpose of spiritual phenomena
 What is Mediumship
 How to determine if a medium is a charlatan
 How to determine whether a given communication is worth
 How to deal with contradictory communications

Specific aspects of the doctrine
This chapter introduces some new doctrine that would be further elaborated on The Gospel According to Spiritism.

 Plurality of worlds
 Nature of the soul
 The incarnated spirit
 The disincarnation (death) of a person

See also
 The Spirits Book
 The Gospel According to Spiritism

Books about spirituality
Spiritism